Core histone macro-H2A.2 is a protein that in humans is encoded by the H2AFY2 gene.

References

Further reading